John Moir (1814–1889) was a Scottish Episcopalian priest.

The son of David Moir, Bishop of Brechin, he was born in 1814, educated at  King's College, Aberdeen;and ordained in 1837. He was the Incumbent at Arradoul then Brechin. He was Dean of Brechin from 1848 to 1861; the Incumbent of Jedburgh from 1861 to 1888; and Dean of Glasgow and Galloway from 1878 to 1888.

He died on 5 December 1889.

References

Alumni of the University of Aberdeen
Deans of Glasgow and Galloway
Deans of Brechin
1814 births
1889 deaths